Sidney "Sunshine" Gepford  (December 15, 1896 – September 9, 1924) was an American football halfback who played one season in the American Professional Football Association with the Decatur Staleys.  He is considered one of the first APFA/NFL players to die, since the league's formation in 1920, and the first as a result of football-related head injuries.

Early life and education 
Gepford was born in Decatur, Illinois, the youngest child of Capitola (Knight) and John F. Gepford.  He first enrolled at Millikin University before attending Bethany College. He attended Stephen Decatur High School in Decatur.

Football career 
With the Millikin Big Blue, Gepford played halfback and quarterback. In November 1919, he and teammate Roy Adkins joined the Staleys for their game against the Taylorville Independents, which the Staleys won. However, the two were exposed by Millikin head coach Norman Wann and banned from Millikin athletics for violating their amateur athlete statuses, though they were allowed to remain in school. They permanently joined the Staleys for the remainder of the year and into 1920, with Gepford playing quarterback/halfback for the football team and was a member of the basketball team. He also worked for A. E. Staley in the summer.

In 1922, Gepford and Adkins enrolled at Bethany College on the advice of a former Millikin coach. As Bethany did not have rules regarding amateur eligibility, the two were also joined by players from the Staleys. During a 1923 game against Butler, Gepford suffered a concussion but continued to play. Due to the injury, he began experiencing headaches that persisted while he worked at Staley and prepared for his new job as a high school history teacher in Marion, Illinois. On September 9, 1924, he committed suicide by gunshot, which his mother attributed to his concussion (chronic traumatic encephalopathy).

References

Further reading 
 Cassidy, Alex (2022). Sunshine: The Tragic True Story of the NFL's First Suicide,  ASIN: ‎ B0B3F48B7W

External links
Just Sports Stats

1890s births
1924 suicides
Players of American football from Illinois
American football halfbacks
Millikin Big Blue football players
Bethany Bison football players
Decatur Staleys players
Suicides by firearm in Illinois
American football players with chronic traumatic encephalopathy